Guangzhou–Shanwei high-speed railway is a high-speed railway currently under construction in China. The railway will shorten the journey between Guangzhou and Shanwei to one hour by avoiding Shenzhen.

The services will use the Guangzhou–Shenzhen railway between Guangzhou East and Xintang.

Stations

History
Construction of the line began on 5 July 2017.

References

High-speed railway lines in China
High-speed railway lines under construction